Josipa Bek born 27 January 1988 in Osijek) is a Croatian former tennis player and tennis coach  who specialises in doubles.

She has won as well one singles and eight doubles titles on the ITF Circuit.

College
Bek played on the Clemson University, tennis team between 2008 and 2011.
Reached a career high ranking of No. 8 in singles and No. 1 in doubles, partnering Keri Wong. Won her 100th career match in the match against Florida State University. Won her 106th doubles match in 2012, setting a new school record. Has 29 3-set match wins, which is the most 3-set wins in school history. Three-times All-American in singles and three times All-American in doubles. Runner up of the NCAA Doubles Championship in doubles in 2011 NCAA Division I Tennis Championships.

Career
In July 2005, she won her first professional singles title at the $10k event in Garching beating compatriot Korina Perkovic in the final.

In September 2006 partner Serbian Karolina Jovanović won the ITF 25K tournament in Podgorica, Montenegro. Finale defeated ukrainian twin sisters Lyudmyla Kichenok and Nadiia Kichenok.

In May 2007 partner Bosnian Sandra Martinović won the ITF 25K tournament in Warsaw, Poland. Finale defeated Polish Karolina Kosińska and Russian Arina Rodionova.

At the end of 2007, Bek ended her career. She had won over $16,000

In April 2011 Bosnian Selma Babić won Padel Tennis tournament in Dubai, United Arab Emirates.

References

1988 births
Living people
People from Osijek
Croatian female tennis players
Clemson Tigers women's tennis players
Croatian tennis coaches
21st-century Croatian women